Happy Valley Wuhan is a theme park in Hongshan District, Wuhan, Hubei Province, China. Opened on 29 April 2012, it is the fifth installation of the Happy Valley theme park chain.

Notable rides

References 

Buildings and structures in Wuhan
2012 establishments in China
Amusement parks opened in 2012
Wuhan
Tourist attractions in Wuhan